Podlaskie Voivodeship is divided into 17 counties (powiats): 3 city counties and 14 land counties. These are further divided into 118 gminas.

The counties are shown on the numbered map and detailed in the table beside it.

References

Podlaskie Voivodeship